The Wylie Wabbit 24 is an American trailerable sailboat that was designed by Thomas Wylie as a racer and first built in 1982.

Production
The design was built by North Coast Yachts in the United States, starting in 1982. A total of 63 boats were completed before it went out of production.

Design
The Wylie Wabbit 24 is a recreational keelboat, built predominantly of fiberglass, with wood trim. Construction is iso resin, E-glass, with a foam core on the hull bottom. It has a fractional sloop rig, a raked stem, a reverse transom, an internally mounted spade-type rudder controlled by a tiller and a fixed fin keel. It displaces  and carries  of ballast.

The boat is normally fitted with a small  outboard motor for docking and maneuvering.

The design has sleeping accommodation for two people, with a double "V"-berth in the bow cabin.

For sailing downwind the design may be equipped with a symmetrical spinnaker and a trapeze is also used for racing.

Operational history
The boat is supported by an active class club that organizes racing events, the Wylie Wabbit Class.

The designer describes the boat, "the Wabbit is a camper-cruiser for spirited people who want to go fast whenever and wherever. For this reason, she is the maximum trailerable weight for a small family sedan. Her sail inventory is minimal: one main, one jib, and one spinnaker, yet speeds of 20 knots are common. The boat lends itself to experienced sailors, but if a welcomed beginner makes a mistake on the trapeze, swimming is not the penalty."

In a 2010 review Steve Henkel wrote, "the Wabbit is 'a long, lean, light, and very fast boat that could also function as a simple camping cruiser.' ... Is she fast? Well, her PHRF averages 150, more like that for a 30- to 36-foot racer-cruiser, so you can guess the answer. Best features: She's so fast it will make your head spin. Worst features: With such slight headroom and diminutive Space Index, you won't want to sleep aboard very often."

See also
List of sailing boat types

References

External links

Keelboats
1980s sailboat type designs
Sailing yachts
Trailer sailers
Sailboat type designs by Thomas Wylie
Sailboat types built by North Coast Yachts